Reach plc (known as Trinity Mirror between 1999 and 2018) is a British newspaper, magazine and digital publisher. It is one of Britain's biggest newspaper groups, publishing 240 regional papers in addition to the national Daily Mirror, Sunday Mirror, The Sunday People, Daily Express, Sunday Express, Daily Star, Daily Star Sunday as well as the Scottish Daily Record and Sunday Mail and the magazine OK! Since purchasing Local World, it has gained 83 print publications. Reach plc's headquarters are at Canary Wharf in London. It is listed on the London Stock Exchange.

History
The Daily Mirror was launched by Alfred Harmsworth, 1st Viscount Northcliffe, "for gentlewomen" in 1903. The company was first listed on the London Stock Exchange on 2 December 1953. In 1958 the International Publishing Company (IPC) acquired Mirror Group Newspapers, but IPC was in turn taken over by publishing giant Reed International in 1970. In 1984 Pergamon Holdings, a company owned by Robert Maxwell, acquired the Daily Mirror from Reed International. The company was relisted as Mirror Group in 1991.

In 1991 the company was due to be investigated via an Anton Piller order for alleged theft of software from companies including Adobe Inc., Autodesk and Microsoft. The action was delayed as it coincided with Maxwell's death, but was recommenced in 1992. Subsequently it was reported that "At the Mirror Group, for instance, 700 out of the 800 software programs in use were found to be illegal".

The company bought Scottish & Universal Newspapers in 1992, and in 1997 it acquired the Birmingham Post and Mail group of newspapers. In 1999 Trinity International Holdings, owners of the Liverpool Echo, merged with Mirror Group to form Trinity Mirror.

During 2005 the company introduced a number of measures to manage discretionary spending more carefully, some of which attracted press attention. 

In 2007, the company sought to sell a number of titles: the Reading Chronicle was sold to Berkshire Media Group and 25 Trinity Mirror South titles were sold to Northcliffe Media. On 1 October 2007 it was announced that the sale of the Racing Post had been completed: the entire sale process had raised £263 million.

In September 2008 the company announced that it would be closing the printing plant in Liverpool after 154 years of printing in the city, and transferring the work to Oldham. 

In February 2010, Trinity Mirror bought the regional M.E.N. Media and S&B Media divisions of Guardian Media Group, containing 22 local titles across Northern England and in Surrey and Berkshire. This included the Manchester Evening News and Reading Evening Post. 

In March 2010 Trinity Mirror stated that it would end its bout of staff cuts and newspaper closures. The announcement came as the company reported pre-tax profits of £72.7m for 2009, exceeding analysts expectations.

In January 2012 it was announced Trinity Mirror acquired Communicator Corp, a digital communications company specialising in email and mobile communications for £8m. In August 2013, Trinity Mirror announced its partnership with whocanfixmycar.com, a portal connecting motorists nationwide with trusted local garages and mechanics.

In June 2014, Trinity Mirror transitioned its online bingo software from Dragonfish to Virtue Fusion from Playtech for its group of bingo brands.

In November 2015, Trinity Mirror purchased Local World, a major stakeholder in local news titles, from DMGT. Local World had been formed by former Trinity chief exec David Montgomery in 2012 to consolidate all DMGT's local newspaper holdings other than the Metro, expanding their holdings while streamlining production, to make the group more saleable. Its 115 titles were formed primarily by those of Harmsworth's historic Northcliffe Newspapers Group, alongside other smaller purchases made by DMGT and Local World subsequently, including the 2007 purchase from Trinity. The purchase increased Trinity Mirror's local circulation by around 50%. The deal valued Local World at around £220 million.

In February 2018, the company completed the acquisition of the publishing assets of Northern & Shell, including the Daily Express, Sunday Express, Daily Star and OK!. Following completion, Trinity Mirror announced a plan to rebrand as Reach, subject to investor approval at a meeting scheduled for May 2018. Following completion of the acquisition, the Competition and Markets Authority launched a preliminary investigation into the deal, requiring Trinity Mirror to keep Express Newspapers as a standalone entity.

In July 2020, Reach announced that it was cutting 550 jobs, 12% of its workforce, because of falling income amid reduced demand for advertising in its titles.

Phone hacking 
In January 2011, former MP Paul Marsden announced that he was considering taking legal action against Trinity Mirror, over alleged phone hacking. He said he believed he may have been a victim of hacking by a journalist working for a Trinity Mirror title in 2003. At that time, a number of phone hacking allegations had been made against the News of the World, but Marsden's allegation was the first specific claim to be made against another newspaper.

On 24 September 2014, Trinity Mirror admitted for the first time that some of its journalists had been involved in phone hacking. It admitted liability and agreed to pay compensation to four people who had sued for the alleged hacking of voicemails (entertainer Shane Richie, soap actresses Shobna Gulati and Lucy Benjamin and BBC creative director Alan Yentob). The four also received an apology. Trinity Mirror also announced that it had earlier settled six other phone hacking claims in relation to former England football manager Sven-Göran Eriksson, footballer Garry Flitcroft, actor Christopher Eccleston, showbusiness agent Phil Dale, Richie's wife Christine Roche and Abbie Gibson, a former nanny of David and Victoria Beckham. As of September 2014, a further 19 claims were registered at the High Court and another 10 claimants had indicated they would bring proceedings against Trinity Mirror. The company is thought to have set aside £8m to £9m to settle phone hacking claims and legal costs. Other reports claimed that the number of victims could be much higher, with Dr Evan Harris, associate director of the pressure group Hacked Off describing the revelations as: “… just the tip of a very big iceberg". Following the admissions, shares in the group closed at 178.75p, down by 1.24 per cent.

On 6 November 2014, Graham Johnson, who worked at the Sunday Mirror between 1997 and 2005 and had served as the paper's investigations editor, became the first Mirror Group Newspapers journalist to admit to phone hacking when he pleaded guilty at Westminster Magistrates' Court. The trial began after he had contacted the police voluntarily in 2013. A spokesman for Trinity Mirror said the company would not be making a comment on Johnson's conviction.

On 13 February 2015, Trinity Mirror published a public apology to "all its victims of phone hacking" on page two of the Daily Mirror. It also set aside a further £8m to cover both the cost of settling future phone hacking compensation payments to victims yet to come forward and the associated legal expenses. This brought the total set aside by Trinity Mirror in relation to phone hacking to £12m. The statement of apology said that the "unacceptable intrusion […] was unlawful and should never have happened, and fell far below the standards our readers expect and deserve".  It added that the practice had "long since been banished from Trinity Mirror's business and we are committed to ensuring it will not happen again". The same apology was printed in the following editions of the Sunday People and Sunday Mirror.

A hearing at the High Court in London heard on 3 March 2015 that one Mirror group journalist had hacked the phones of some 100 celebrities every day and that 109 stories had been published about just seven claimants. The hearing was to consider "representative claims" in order to establish damages guidelines for subsequent cases. The BBC reported that in MGN's written argument Matthew Nicklin QC had said that it had published a public apology to all hacking victims and its parent company Trinity Mirror had sent private letters of apology to the eight claimants. Nicklin added: "The claimants now face trial secure in the knowledge that MGN has admitted liability, and has also publicly and privately apologised to them and expressed regret at what certain of its former employees did in the past".

On 21 May 2015, damages totaling nearly £1.25m were awarded to eight people as the result of phone hacking by Mirror Group journalists, including actress Sadie Frost (£260,000) and ex-footballer Paul Gascoigne (£188,250). Other damages recipients included soap opera actors Shane Richie (£155,000), Shobna Gulati (£117,500) and Lucy Benjamin (real name Lucy Taggart,  £157,250), as well as BBC creative director Alan Yentob (£85,000), TV producer Robert Ashworth (former husband of Coronation Street actress Tracy Shaw, £201,250) and flight attendant Lauren Alcorn (former girlfriend of footballer Rio Ferdinand, £72,500).

The awards were larger than had been made previously in phone hacking cases. Mr Justice Mann explained this, saying: "The length, degree and frequency of all this conduct explains why the sums I have awarded are so much greater than historical awards. People whose private voicemail messages were hacked so often and for so long, and had very significant parts of their private lives exposed, and then reported on, are entitled to significant compensation".

Following the announcement of the damages awards, Mr Justice Mann was told that a further 10 cases had been settled and that approximately another 70 other claims were outstanding. The Mirror Group said it would consider whether to seek permission to appeal against the size of the damages, but increased the money allocated to deal with phone hacking claims from £12m to £28m.

Operations

Newspapers

Reach plc's printing division, Reach Printing Services, is located at nine press sites throughout the UK, printing and distributing thirty-six major newspapers for the UK, including the Daily Mirror and Sunday Mirror, the Sunday People, the Daily Record (in Scotland), and other contract titles including titles for the Guardian Media Group. Reach plc also owns a number of local titles in Northern England and in Surrey and Berkshire, after acquiring a number of titles from the Guardian Media Group in 2010.

Digital
In 2013, Trinity Mirror launched the content websites UsVsTh3m and Ampp3d on an experimental basis. UsVsTh3m was a website similar to BuzzFeed focused on quizzes and Flash games, edited by B3ta founder Rob Manuel and running the Tumblr platform. Ampp3d focused on data journalism and used the WordPress platform. Both websites were closed down in 2015.

References

External links

Reach plc
Companies based in the London Borough of Tower Hamlets
Magazine publishing companies of the United Kingdom
Newspaper companies of the United Kingdom
Publishing companies established in 1903